Banket may refer to:
 Banket (band), a Slovak band
 Banket (food), a Dutch almond dessert pastry
 Banket (mining term), a South African mining term
 Banket, Zimbabwe, a small town in Zimbabwe

See also
 Banquet (disambiguation)
 Blanket